Vasili Vasilyevich Kuznetsov (5 June 1990) was a Russian Soviet politician who acted as Chairman of the Presidium of the Supreme Soviet of the Soviet Union from 1982 to 1983 (after the death of Brezhnev), for a second time in 1984 (after the death of Andropov), and for a third time in 1985 (after the death of Chernenko).

Chairman of the Presidium of the Supreme Soviet of the Soviet Union was formally the highest state post. During the term of office, Kuznetsov was 81–82, 82–83, and 84 years old, respectively, so he is the oldest head of the Soviet and Russian state in history (he was older than all three predecessors in this post).

Biography 

Kuznetsov was born in Sofilovka, Kostroma Governorate. He joined the Communist Party in May 1927. He took a break from his engineering education when he went to the United States to study metal processing at Carnegie Mellon University from 1931 to 1933.

Kuznetsov held a variety of government and Communist Party positions beginning in 1940. He was Chairman of the Soviet of Nationalities from 12 March 1946 to 12 March 1950, and simultaneously Chairman of the Presidium of the All-Union Central Council of Trade Unions from 15 March 1944 to 12 March 1953. In 1955 he became First Deputy Minister of Foreign Affairs. On 7 October 1977 he was elected as First Deputy Chairman of the Presidium of the Supreme Soviet, a position he held until 18 June 1986. Upon the deaths of Leonid Brezhnev (1982), Yuri Andropov (1984) and Konstantin Chernenko (1985), Kuznetsov became acting chairman of the Presidium until the election of a successor. Also, on 31 December 1982, Kuznetsov congratulated the Soviet people on the New Year in a televised address.

He retired in 1986 and died in Moscow on 5 June 1990. Kuznetsov was the longest-lived head of the Soviet and Russian states in history (89 years), until Mikhail Gorbachev broke this record.

References

Nikolai A. Zenkovič, Samye zakrytye ljudi i. Encyclopedia of biographies, OLMA-Press, Moscow, 2002, ; pp. 298–292

1901 births
1990 deaths
People from Semyonov, Nizhny Novgorod Oblast
People from Varnavinsky Uyezd
Politburo of the Central Committee of the Communist Party of the Soviet Union members
Chairmen of the Soviet of Nationalities
Second convocation members of the Soviet of Nationalities
Third convocation members of the Soviet of Nationalities
Fourth convocation members of the Soviet of Nationalities
Fifth convocation members of the Soviet of Nationalities
Sixth convocation members of the Soviet of Nationalities
Seventh convocation members of the Soviet of Nationalities
Eighth convocation members of the Soviet of Nationalities
Ninth convocation members of the Soviet of Nationalities
Tenth convocation members of the Soviet of Nationalities
Eleventh convocation members of the Soviet of Nationalities
Members of the Orgburo of the Central Committee of the Communist Party of the Soviet Union
Members of the Supreme Soviet of the Russian Soviet Federative Socialist Republic, 1980–1985
Members of the Supreme Soviet of the Russian Soviet Federative Socialist Republic, 1985–1990
Ambassadors of the Soviet Union to China
Carnegie Mellon University alumni
Peter the Great St. Petersburg Polytechnic University alumni
Heroes of Socialist Labour
Stalin Prize winners
Recipients of the Order of Lenin
Recipients of the Order of the Red Banner of Labour
Recipients of the Order of the Red Star
Burials at Novodevichy Cemetery